Don't Gamble with Strangers is a 1946 film about two card sharks, pretending to be brother and sister, who clean out a small-town banker, then take over a crooked gambling joint.

Cast 
Kane Richmond as Mike Sarno
Bernadene Hayes as Fay Benton
Peter Cookson as Bob Randall
Gloria Warren as Ruth Hamilton
Charles Trowbridge as Creighton
Frank Dae as John Randall
Anthony Caruso as Pinky Luiz
Philip Van Zandt as Morelli

External links 
 

1946 films
1940s English-language films
Films directed by William Beaudine
1946 drama films
American drama films
American black-and-white films
Monogram Pictures films
1940s American films